Stojkovići may refer to the following places in Bosnia and Herzegovina:

Stojkovići (Foča)
Stojkovići (Kiseljak)
Stojkovići, Konjic
Stojkovići, Novi Travnik